Club 3D, founded in 1997 as Colour Power (Club 3D since 2005), is a Dutch brand of video cards and digital multimedia products such as TV tuner cards and digital sound cards for PCs, featuring AMD graphics chipsets and technologies.

History 
Pioneers in the introduction of the first graphics cards from S3 Graphics, 3dfx, ATI Technologies and NVIDIA. 
Previously the only privately owned company in the world that officially sold AMD/ATI and NVIDIA under one brand.

 2001 – Pioneers at being the first AIB (Add-in-Board) for ATI/AMD. Launched ATI AIB solutions at Computex, 2001.
 2001 – Branch office in Germany for the DACH market
 2003 – Official partnership with S3 Graphics
 2003 – Official partnership with XGI Technologies
 2004 – Generated an excess of 900,000 retail unit sales of ATI Technologies video card graphics adapters
 2006 – Official partnership with NVIDIA Corporation
 2006 – Launched Theatron products, range of sound cards
 2007 – Launched VAX Barcelona bag accessories range
 2010 – Official launch of the accessories division
 2011 – Official launch of high end 80 plus switching power supplies division
 2011 – Official launch of SenseVision division, USB powered video graphics adapters
 2013 - Drops NVIDIA support and commits to AMD only.
 2016 - First to market worldwide with the Displayport 1.2 to HDMI 2.0 Active Adapters

References

Graphics cards
Companies established in 1997
Privately held companies of the Netherlands
Graphics hardware companies
Dutch brands